Substance is the fourth studio album by Trance duo Blank & Jones. It was released in 2002.

Track listing
"Substance" – 2:42
"Desire" - 6:42
"Watching the Waves" – 7:17
"Coming to Life" – 5:49
"Elve's Cry" – 5:17
"Suburban Hell" – 5:36
"Closer to the Edge" – 7:10
"The Art of Love" – 6:06
"D-Battery" – 5:10
"It's Allright" – 5:19
"Golden Moon" – 8:35
"Desire (Ambient Mix)" – 8:05

Blank & Jones albums
2002 albums